The women's luge at the 2014 Winter Olympics was held on 10–11 February 2014 at the Sliding Center Sanki in Rzhanaya Polyana, Russia.

Qualifying athletes
The top 28, with each nation allowed a maximum of 3, after five of five races. Czech Republic and South Korea receive the team relay allocations to complete a team. Since the men's singles competition did not use its last quota, a spot also goes to Kazakhstan (the next best ranked nation without representation).

Competition schedule
All times are (UTC+4).

Results
The four runs were split over two days.

References

Luge at the 2014 Winter Olympics
Women's events at the 2014 Winter Olympics